The Battle of Baghdad begun in February 2006 and continued until May 2008, for control of the capital city of Iraq. A combined force of Iraqi Security Forces and the allies including the U.S. Army fought against insurgents to retain control of the city during the sectarian civil war that engulfed the country in 2006.

The battle coincided with an unsuccessful coalition operation called Together Forward which was to significantly reduce the violence in Baghdad which had seen a sharp uprise in sectarian violence since the mid-February 2006 bombing of the Askariya Mosque, a major Shia Muslim shrine. Insurgents managed take control of more than 80 percent of Baghdad before an offensive conducted by Iraqi forces and allies to secure Baghdad. Insurgents also made huge gains in the western Al Anbar and southern Babil province, temporarily forcing Coalition and Iraqi security forces from many towns and cities. Most direct insurgent control of Baghdad ended by late-2007, and by mid-2008 Iraqi forces and allies mostly secured Baghdad and reached an agreement with Mahdi army to allow government forces to enter and patrol the Sadr City district of the city, thus fully securing Baghdad and restoring calm in the central parts of Iraq.

References

Battles of the Iraq War involving the United Kingdom
Battles of the Iraq War involving the United States